The event was not held in 1999. The defending champions from 1998 were Mariano Hood and Sebastián Prieto, but they lost in the first round this year.

Gustavo Kuerten and Antonio Prieto won the title, defeating Lan Bale and Piet Norval 6–2, 6–4 in the final.

Seeds

Draw

Draw

References
Draw

Chile Open (tennis)
2000 ATP Tour
2000 in Chilean tennis